The Mississippi Freedom Project (MFP) is an archive of oral histories collected by the Samuel Proctor Oral History Program at the University of Florida. The ongoing project contains 100+ interviews online and focuses on interviews with civil rights veterans and notable residents of the Mississippi Delta. The collection centers on activism and organizing in partnership with the Sunflower County Civil Rights Organization in Sunflower, Mississippi.

Project history and annual research trip 

SPOHP director Paul Ortiz began conducting oral history field work in the Mississippi Delta in 1995 as a graduate research coordinator of the National Endowment for the Humanities-sponsored "Behind the Veil: Documenting African American Life in the Jim Crow South" project at the Center for Documentary Studies, and maintained a relationship with the Sunflower County Civil Rights Organization, a local civil rights veteran group. Since 2008, the Samuel Proctor Oral History Program has traveled to the Delta on annual research trips with undergraduate students, graduate students, and program staff for the Mississippi Freedom Project to collect oral histories of the local movement. In 2014, SPOHP returned to the Delta on its annual trip for 50th anniversary celebrations honoring movement veterans of Freedom Summer from June 23–29.

During the trip, the Mississippi Freedom Project conducts oral history interviews in partnership with the Sunflower County Civil Rights Organization, and frequently works with research allies including the McComb Legacies Project, Friends of Justice, Fannie Lou Hamer Civil Rights Museum in Belzoni, MS, the United Food and Commercial Workers Union in Belzoni, Museum of African American History in Natchez, MS, Emmett Till Historic Intrepid Center, Sunflower County Freedom Project, and Civic Media Center, as well as George A. Smathers Libraries at the University of Florida.

The Mississippi Freedom Project research team is guided in their research by lifelong civil rights activist Margaret Block, who grew up in Bolivar County and worked with SNCC throughout the Delta with leaders including Stokely Carmichael, Amzie Moore, Fannie Lou Hamer, Bob Moses, Hollis Watkins, and her brother, Sam Block, during voter registration drives and citizenship school initiatives. Block is the main leader and instructor for SPOHP's MFP tour of the Delta, frequently speaking at panel events and leading driving tours of historical sites that are significant to the movement and Mississippi history, including Mound Bayou, Dockery Plantation, Indianola, MS, Ruleville, MS, sites surrounding Emmett Till's murder in Tallahatchie County, and others, including Winterville Mounds.

The next research trip will take place June 15–20, 2015.

Collections 

The Mississippi Freedom Project oral history collections focus on history of the civil rights movement in the Mississippi Delta from veteran activists and notable residents. In Summer 2013, UF's George A. Smathers Libraries approved a mini-grant proposal to transcribe the SPOHP's Mississippi Freedom Project collection. The grant improved online access to the Mississippi Freedom Project collection, sponsoring the processing of over 50 interviews, creation of educational podcasts, and development of expanded online media content. Over 70 interviews are now available as of July 2014, timed to coincide with Freedom Summer anniversaries.
"I Never Will Forget", an edited volume of 60 oral history interviews with civil rights veterans in Sunflower County, was published in June 2014 for the Freedom Summer reunion.
Major topics include: 

Civil rights movement
Jim Crow laws
Citizens' Councils
Segregation
Integration
Sharecropping
Student Nonviolent Coordinating Committee (SNCC)
Women in SNCC, with interviews from Peggy Klekotka
Congress of Racial Equality (CORE)
Southern Christian Leadership Conference (SCLC)
Council of Federated Organizations (COFO)
COINTELPRO (Counter Intelligence Program)
Black Panther Party
Labor union organizing
Selma to Montgomery Rights March
United Food and Commercial Workers International Union
History of Sunflower County, MS, Bolivar County, MS, McComb, MS, Jones County, MS, and more.

The Mississippi Freedom Project archives include over 135 interviews, 76 are available online as of July 2014:

Liz Fusco Aaronsohn
James Abbott
Reverend Dr. Alan Bean and Nancy Bean
Margaret Block
Nathaniel Boclair, Jr.
Earnest Brown
Otis Brown
Bertha Burres
Florine Carter
Gelda Chandler
Thelma Collins
Allen Cooper
Gloria Dickerson
Darron L. Edwards
Tanya Evans
Charles Featherstone
Delta State Equal Rights Panel (2009)
Emma Golden
Heather Hudson
Tommy Farmer
Dennis Flannigan
Lawrence Guyot, Jr.
Anita and Arrack Jefferson
Everlyn Johnson
Hattie Jordan
Margaret Kibbee
Foster King
Karen Jo Koonan
Lilly Lavallais
Tommie Novick Lunsford
McKinley Mack
Atavis Minton
Greg McCoy
Charles Modley
Justine Moser
Benjamin Nance
Rosa Parks (with UF Libraries' James S. Haskins Collection) concerning the Montgomery Bus Boycott of 1955 and other events leading up to Freedom Summer
Sheriel Perkins
Elmo Proctor
David Rushing
Charles Scott
Isaac Shorter
Helen Sims
Valerie Simpson
Willie Spurlock
Eddie Steel
Jerry Tecklin
Ryan Thomas
Carver Randle
Akinyele Umoja
Hollis Watkins
Dorsey White
Stacey White
Jakylla Williams
Kelvin Williams
Bright Winn

See also 

Oral history
Mississippi Freedom Summer
Samuel Proctor Oral History Program
University of Florida
College of Liberal Arts and Sciences
George A. Smathers Libraries
University of Florida Digital Collections

References

External links 

 Samuel Proctor Oral History Program official website
 Mississippi Freedom Project Archives at UF's Digital Collections
 Samuel Proctor Oral History Program Oral History Archives at UF's Digital Collections
 Samuel Proctor Oral History Program YouTube Channel

Oral history
African Americans' rights organizations
Civil rights movement
History of African-American civil rights